Sapindopsis ("Sapindus-like") is an extinct form genus for leaves of the Cretaceous Period, originally considered similar to soapberry. Associated reproductive structures now suggest it was more closely related to planes and sycamores of the family Platanaceae.

Description 
In the form generic system of paleobotany Sapindopsis is used only for leaves, which are compound with three to six leaflets. Leaflets vary in distinctness or confluence with the midrib. The venation is pinnate, eucamptodromous to brochidodromus, with percurrent tertiary veins.

Distribution and species 
Sapindopsis was geographically widespread from Asia to North America. Species include:

†Sapindopsis magnifolia (Fontaine) Dilcher and Basson 1990 (type), from the Potomac Group, Early Cretaceous (Barremian) of Virginia, USA
†Sapindopsis anhouryi Dilcher and Basson 1990, from the Sannine Formation, mid-Cretaceous (Cenomanian) of Namoura, Lebanon.
†Sapindopsis asiaticus Golovneva and Sun 2022, from the Krivorechenskaya Formation (upper Albian-lower Turonian) of Russia.
†Sapindopsis chinensis Golovneva and Sun 2022, from the Dalazi Formation of China and Alchan Formation of Russia (upper Albian) 
†Sapindopsis orientalis Golovneva and Sun 2022, from the Frentsevka Formation of Russia.
†Sapindopsis powelliana (Lesquereux) Wang and Dilcher 2018, from the Dakota Formation, mid-Cretaceous (Cenomanian) of Kansas, USA. Distefananthus hoisingtonensis (Huegele and Wang 2022) may represent the inflorescence of the same species.
†Sapindopsis retallackii Wang and Dilcher 2018, from the Dakota Formation, mid-Cretaceous (Cenomanian) of Kansas, USA
†Sapindopsis variabilis  Fontaine 1889, from the Patapsco Formation, Early Cretaceous (Barremian) of Virginia, USA

References 

Cretaceous plants
Prehistoric angiosperm genera
Platanaceae